Mary's Land, by Lucia St. Clair Robson, is a 1995 historical novel, set in the year 1638. It is based on Margaret Brent's life.

External links
book club discussion points, background information, and an excerpt

1995 American novels
American historical novels
Novels by Lucia St. Clair Robson
Fiction set in 1638
Novels set in the 17th century